The 2000–01 season is Zamalek Sports Club 90th season of football since existence in 1911, 46th consecutive season in the Egyptian Premier League, the top flight in the Egyptian football. The club qualified to the 2001 African Cup Winners' Cup as the defending champions, earned the right to participate in the 2001 CAF Super Cup against Hearts of Oak; the winner of the 2000 CAF Champions League.

Staff

Board of directors

Coaching staff

Pre-season

2000 Arab Cup Winners' Cup Qualifying Round

Zone 2 (Red Sea)

Competitions

2000–01 Egyptian Premier League

Position

2000–01 Egypt Cup

First round

Round of 16

2001 African Cup Winners' Cup

First round

Second round

Quarter-finals

2001 CAF Super Cup

References

External links
 http://www.angelfire.com/ak/EgyptianSports/zamalek200001.html

Zamalek SC seasons
Zamalek